John Boorman (c. 1754 – 1 August 1807) was an English cricketer whose known career spanned 26 seasons from 1768 to 1793. In Scores & Biographies, Arthur Haygarth recorded that he found a reference to Boorman "in another account" (re a single wicket match in 1772) which called him James, but Haygarth was convinced that the correct name was John which recurred. Haygarth discovered that Boorman was "probably" born at Cranbrook in Kent but may have resided for many years at Sevenoaks, though he certainly died at Ashurst in Sussex, where he spent his latter years as a farmer. Boorman's year of birth is an estimate based on evidence found by Haygarth that he was 53 when he died and Haygarth made a comment that Boorman "began playing in great matches very young". Boorman is believed to have been a left-handed batsman but it is not known if he bowled left arm. Like all bowlers of the time, he was underarm but his pace is unknown. As a fielder, he was generally deployed at point.

Many of Boorman's appearances are unrecorded, as is the case with all 18th century players. The total number of appearances credited to him in the sources is 63, of which 61 were in important eleven-a-side matches and two in single wicket matches.

Boorman is first recorded in May 1768 playing in a five-a-side single wicket match at the Artillery Ground. He was in a team formed by Sir Horatio Mann, playing against John Sackville's Five, and scored eight runs in the match which Sackville's team won by four wickets. A few weeks later, Boorman made his first known appearance in an important match when he played for Mann's Bourne team against Henry Rowett's Caterham on Westerham Common. One of the earliest scorecards has survived and records that Boorman scored one and nine, but Caterham won by 14 runs.

Boorman played mostly for Kent, but he also made appearances for All-England teams. He played for Middlesex as a given man against Essex in the earliest known match on Lord's Old Ground in May 1787, top scoring for the home side in both innings with 23 and 37. He also took a known six (i.e., bowled only) wickets in the match which Middlesex won by 93 runs. From 1791 to 1793, Boorman made six known appearances for Essex and Haygarth suggested that he might have removed into the county, but with no certainty.

References

Bibliography
 
 
 

1750s births
1807 deaths
English cricketers
Essex cricketers
Kent cricketers
Middlesex cricketers
English cricketers of 1701 to 1786
English cricketers of 1787 to 1825
Non-international England cricketers
Hornchurch Cricket Club cricketers
West Kent cricketers
East Kent cricketers